Lisgar can mean:
John Young, 1st Baron Lisgar, the second Governor-General of Canada
Lisgar Collegiate Institute, Ottawa's oldest high school
Lisgar (electoral district), a Manitoba riding
Lisgar GO Station, a commuter-rail station in Mississauga, Ontario, Canada

See also
Lisgar—Marquette, a Manitoba riding